David Carl "Dave" Hofstra (born May 21, 1953, Leavenworth, Kansas) is an American jazz double-bassist. He also plays bass guitar and tuba.

Hofstra was an autodidact on bass. In 1980 and 1981, he was a founding member of The Waitresses, a new wave band based in Akron, Ohio, and played on their 1982 studio album, Wasn't Tomorrow Wonderful?. He was active primarily in New York from the 1980s, playing with William Parker, Denis Charles, Elliott Sharp, Paul Shapiro, Bobby Previte, Wayne Horvitz, Saheb Sarbib, Bobby Radcliff, Jemeel Moondoc, Marie McAuliffe, Bill Frisell, Robin Eubanks, Greg Osby, David Rosenbloom, Phillip Johnston, Chris Kelsey, Clare Daly, and Robin Holcomb. He is also a founding member of The Microscopic Septet, and has played on every one of their eight albums.

References

American jazz double-bassists
Male double-bassists
Musicians from Kansas
1953 births
Living people
21st-century double-bassists
21st-century American male musicians
American male jazz musicians